John Ellis Wool (February 20, 1784 – November 10, 1869) was an officer in the United States Army during three consecutive U.S. wars: the War of 1812, the Mexican–American War and the American Civil War. By the time of the Mexican-American War, he was widely considered one of the most capable officers in the army and a superb organizer.

He was one of the four general officers of the United States Army in 1861, and was the one who had the most service. When the war began, Wool, age 77 and a brigadier general for 20 years, commanded the Department of the East. He was the oldest general on either side of the war.

Early life and education
John Ellis Wool was born in Newburgh, New York.  When he was orphaned at a young age, he went to live with his grandfather, James Wool, in Troy, New York. He attended a local school and, at the age of twelve, began working at a store in Troy. He later read the law with an established firm in order to learn and be admitted to the bar.

War of 1812
At the outbreak of the War of 1812, Wool was a practicing attorney in Troy, New York.

Battle of Queenston Heights
When he volunteered at the age of 28, he was commissioned as a captain in the 13th United States Infantry Regiment on April 14, 1812. He fought at the Battle of Queenston Heights in 1812, where he was shot through his thighs. John E. Wool led a commando-like strike team of 60 men through unguarded terrain hidden in the thicket of maple trees that successfully surprised and captured the enemy cannon thus defeating their crew. But the cannon was spiked by the British before being captured. On the heights above the British and Canadians, the Americans fanned out. The Americans hid among the trees and foliage, and the Americans continued firing their muskets at the British and Canadians as they crested up the hill. The Americans sheltered behind trees, logs, and bushes sniped at the British. British commander Isaac Brock charged in the open with his men against the sheltered Americans but was shot and killed by an American marksman who had hidden behind a tree. Another British commander John Macdonell also died leading a charge against sheltered concealed Americans. Even though the Americans held a superior position. Their morale was low, they were intimidated by the Native American Allies of the British whom they greatly feared, and had weak leadership. Eventually the Americans lost the battle.

Battle of Plattsburgh
After recovering from his wound, Wool was promoted major of the 29th United States Infantry Regiment on April 13, 1813, which he led with distinction at the Battle of Plattsburgh in 1814. It was September 6, 1814. The British arrived with a large army. The British encountered the American and both sides exchanged heavy fire. A British Colonel Wellington who was a nephew of Lord Wellington was killed. John E. Wool and his 250 regulars fell back in front of the British column, finding cover behind the fences and trees of the roadway. The Americans lied behind stone fences and secreted themselves in the wood-until the British would arrive within gunshot-then the Americans would open fire and retire a half mile at the time-in this matter the Americans fought them for 6 miles when the British main force arrived and the Americans were compelled to give up one half the town.

At Halsey’s corner, near the Platt farm on the Beekmantown road. American Regulars accompanying the artillery masked the 3 cannons in the middle of the roadway behind a stonewall. The American Regulars positioned themselves behind the stone wall with Aiken’s teenage volunteers. The American artillery sheltered behind the wall fired 3 times as those American regulars and teenage volunteers behind the stone wall also fired their rifles, mowing down the British in great numbers. 4 British officers were killed and 100 British privates killed or wounded. American casualties did not exceed 25. The American regulars followed the American militia in retreat across the Saranac River. John E. Wool formed his men on the other side and demolished the bridge.

John E. Wool and his fellow American forces held out until the British suffered major setbacks such as losing the naval engagement against the U.S. Navy, getting lost in a maze of camouflaged roadways laid by the Americans, and constantly facing harassing fire from the American militia from behind trees, rocks, and bushes. The British admit defeat and withdrew from the battlefield making the Americans victors.

After the battle, he was a major of the 6th United States Infantry as of May 17, 1815. As this war was coming to an end, John Ellis Wool was promoted to the rank of Brevet Lieutenant Colonel on September 11, 1814.

Staying on with the U.S. Army
An orphan with little formal education, Wool remained in the military service and was promoted to colonel and Inspector General of the Army on April 29, 1816.  He was sent to Europe in 1832 to observe foreign military organizations and operations. He also participated in the removal of the Cherokee from Georgia and Tennessee in the 1830s. As part of this effort, he established Fort Butler at present-day Murphy, North Carolina as the eastern headquarters of the military removal of the Cherokee. In 1841, Wool was promoted to brigadier general in the U.S. Army and years later in 1847 made commander of the Department of the East.

Mexican–American War and Oregon
He was assigned command of the Center Division and led the Chihuahuan Expedition, which resulted in the capture of Saltillo. After leading his troops 900 miles from San Antonio, Texas, he joined General Zachary Taylor at the Battle of Buena Vista. Wool's leadership was recognized with a Congressional sword, a vote of thanks, and the brevet of major general. After the battle, he commanded the occupation forces of northern Mexico.

He commanded both the Department of the East and the Department of the Pacific after of the war. The first he would command in 1847–1854 and again in 1857–1860; the second he would command in 1854–1857. While in the East, on August 15th, 1848 General Wool laid the cornerstone for the city hospital at Troy, (which later became known as St. Mary's Hospital).

While in charge of the U.S. Army Department of the Pacific, General Wool contributed extensively to the settling of the Indian Wars in Oregon, especially the Rogue River Indian War. He came into the conflict late, after the Oregon territorial government was formed and the Volunteer Militias had committed many acts of genocide against the tribes in southwestern Oregon Territory (including present-day Washington). Based in California, General Wool wrote to local papers with his opinions of the Oregon situation. Generally he defended the Indian tribes and condemned the acts of the militias. The federal government decided to undertake Indian removal to reservations in order to allow their lands to be taken by the settlers, and Wool was to carry it out. Wool wrote to the Territorial Governor Isaac Stevens about the conflicts:

Civil War

When the Civil War began in April 1861, Wool had just turned 77 years old, two years older than commander-in-chief of the US Army Winfield Scott. Unlike Scott, who suffered from obesity, gout, and other ailments, Wool was still reasonably fit and could mount a horse.

Thus in August 1861, John Ellis Wool was named commander of the U.S. Army Department of Virginia, an office that he would hold until June 1862. He moved to equip some of the first regiments sent from New York to the nation's capital and his quick and decisive moves secured Fort Monroe, Virginia, for the Union when other military installations in the South were falling to Confederate forces. The fort guarded the entrance to the Chesapeake Bay and the James River, overlooking Hampton Roads and the Gosport Navy Yard, which the Confederates had seized.  It was to serve as the principal supply depot of Maj. Gen. George B. McClellan's Peninsula Campaign. The septuagenarian Wool thought McClellan was not aggressive enough in his push towards Richmond and in May 1862, he sent troops to occupy the Navy yard, Norfolk, and the surrounding towns after the Confederates abandoned them. The 16th U.S. President, Abraham Lincoln personally witnessed the capture of Norfolk and afterwards rewarded Wool by promoting him to a full major general in the regular army thereby becoming only the 23rd man to hold this rank since its creation in 1791.

Deciding that Wool should have a less demanding assignment at his advanced age, the president transferred him to be the 2nd Commander of the Middle Department in June 1862, which then became the VIII Corps on July 22, 1862. J.E. Wool then served as the 1st Commander of the U.S. Army 8th Corps until December 22, 1862. On January 3, 1863, he again assumed command of the Department of the East where he served until July 18, 1863.

But eventually Wool managed to find his way back into action. After the Battle of Gettysburg, he led troops diverted from that region in military operations to regain control in New York City during and after the draft riots in July of that year. US troops reached the city after rioters had already destroyed numerous buildings, including the Colored Orphan Asylum, which they burned to the ground. Despite the tiny force he had on hand, Wool managed to contain the situation until reinforcements arrived. Thus during July 13–17 of 1863, Wool was the de facto Military Commander of New York City.

On August 1, President Lincoln sent an order retiring Wool from service after 51 years in the Army. At the age of 79, he was the oldest general officer to execute active command in either army during the war.

Retirement and death

Wool, who believed he was still healthy and fit enough for duty, was stunned and outraged at his dismissal and wrote a series of letters to the War Department in protest, but to no avail. He continued sending letters for the remaining few years of his life to the then President Andrew Johnson and Ulysses Grant, again without effect.

Wool lived in Troy, New York for the remaining five years of his life. He died on November 10, 1869. He was buried there in Oakwood Cemetery. An obelisk was erected as a monument to Wool at the cemetery.

Dates of rank
Captain, 13th Infantry - 14 April 1812
Major 29th Infantry - 13 April 1813
Brevet Lieutenant Colonel - 11 September 1814
Major, 6th Infantry - 17 May 1815
Colonel, Inspector General - 29 April 1816 to 21 June 1841
Lieutenant Colonel, 6th Infantry - 10 February 1818 to 1 June 1821
Brevet Brigadier General - 29 April 1826
Brigadier General - 25 June 1841
Brevet Major General - 23 February 1847
Major General - 16 May 1862
Retired - 1 August 1863

See also

 List of American Civil War generals (Union)

Notes

References
 Duncan, Barbara R., and Brett H. Riggs. Cherokee Heritage Trails Guidebook. Chapel Hill: University of North Carolina Press, 2003. .
 Eicher, John H., and David J. Eicher. Civil War High Commands. Stanford, CA: Stanford University Press, 2001. .
 Latimer, Jon. 1812: War with America. Cambridge, MA: Belknap Press of Harvard University Press, 2007. .
 Warner, Ezra J. Generals in Blue: Lives of the Union Commanders. Baton Rouge: Louisiana State University Press, 1964. .
 NCpedia, 16.01.2018 https://www.ncpedia.org/biography/pender-josiah-solomon

External links

 

Inspectors General of the United States Army
1784 births
1869 deaths
Union Army generals
American military personnel of the Mexican–American War
United States Army personnel of the War of 1812
People of New York (state) in the American Civil War
Rogue River Wars
People from Newburgh, New York
Burials at Oakwood Cemetery (Troy, New York)